Chrysocrambus dentuellus is a species of moth in the family Crambidae. It was described by Frank Nelson Pierce and John William Metcalfe in 1938 and is found in Portugal and Spain.

The larvae feed on Festuca ovina.

References

Moths described in 1938
Crambinae